Nezamabad (also Romanized as Nez̧āmābād) is a village in Deh Abbas Rural District, in the Central District of Eslamshahr County, Tehran Province, Iran. At the 2006 census, its population was 1,116, in 295 families.

References 

Populated places in Eslamshahr County